Zokhir Pirimov (born 6 March 1990) is a Uzbekistani football midfielder who currently plays for Surkhon Termez. He was a squad member for the 2009 FIFA U-20 World Cup.

References

1990 births
Living people
Uzbekistani footballers
FC Qizilqum Zarafshon players
FC AGMK players
Buxoro FK players
Navbahor Namangan players
Surkhon Termez players
Uzbekistan youth international footballers
Uzbekistan international footballers
Association football midfielders
Footballers at the 2010 Asian Games
Asian Games competitors for Uzbekistan